The Consulate-General of Finland in Saint Petersburg is the consulate-general of the Republic of Finland in Saint Petersburg, Russian Federation. It is located at four Preobrazhenskaya Square in the Tsentralny district of Saint Petersburg.

See also
 Finland–Russia relations
 Diplomatic missions in Russia
 Anton incident

References

External links
  Consulate-General of Finland in Saint Petersburg

Finland–Russia relations
Finland
Saint Petersburg
Buildings and structures completed in 2004